Danziger, being related to Danzig (Gdańsk, Poland), may refer to:

Danzig/Gdansk, Poland
 Danziger bay, southeastern bay of the Baltic Sea
 Danziger Deutsch, Danzig German, Northeastern German dialects spoken in Gdańsk, Poland
 Danziger Kreuz, Danzig Cross, a Nazi decoration of the Free City of Danzig
 Danziger Willkür, an official set of records of the laws of Danzig

People with the surname
Adolphe Danziger De Castro (1859–1959), Jewish scholar, journalist, lawyer 
Aharon Danziger (fl. 1976–1984), Israeli paralympic volleyball player
Allen Danziger (born 1942), American actor
Avraham Danziger (1748—1820), rabbi, posek and codifier
Cory Danziger, American actor, political activist
Fred Danziger (1906–1948), American football player
Harry Danziger (born 1938), American rabbi
Jazzy Danziger (born 1984), American poet and editor
Jeff Danziger (born 1943), syndicated political cartoonist and author
Joan Danziger (born 1934), American sculptor
Kurt Danziger, academic whose work has focused on the history of psychology
Lucy Danziger, American editor-in-chief of Self magazine
Louis Danziger (born 1923), graphic designer and educator
Nick Danziger (born 1958), British photo journalist
Paula Danziger (1945–2004),  children's author
Simon Danziger (c.1579–c.1615), Dutch privateer and corsair
Sheldon Danziger (born 1948), American economist
Yitzhak Danziger (1916–1977), Israeli sculptor
Yisrael Danziger, Mishmeret Yesha founder
Yoram Danziger (born 1953), justice of the Supreme Court of Israel
The Danzigers, Edward J. Danziger (1909–1999) and Harry Lee Danziger (1913–2005), American TV and film producers

Other uses
Bund der Danziger, an organization of Germans from Danzig
Danziger Bridge, a vertical lift bridge in Louisiana
Danziger Höhe, a district within the Kingdom of Prussia

See also
 

German-language surnames
Toponymic surnames
Polish toponymic surnames
German toponymic surnames
Jewish surnames